Abe Lenstra Stadion is a football stadium, located in Heerenveen, Netherlands. It is currently used mostly as a home ground for Eredivisie club Heerenveen. The current capacity is 27.224.

Naming
The stadium is named after Abe Lenstra, generally considered to be the greatest Heerenveen player in the history of the club. Abe was born on 27 November 1920 in Heerenveen and joined the club aged 15 years. After almost 17 years at Heerenveen, he joined SC Enschede in 1954. He left this club in 1960 to join SC Enschede's archrival Enschedese Boys. In 1963 he stopped playing football at the age of 42. In total he scored 700 goals in about 730 matches. Abe died on 2 September 1985, he was 64 years old, at the eve of what was to become the only international match to be played in the community sportspark that was to become the (old) Abe Lenstrastadium.

Construction of the stadium

The construction of the stadium started in 1993. The plan was to build a stadium with open corners, but when the construction was well underway the club decided to close the gaps. At the time the building was finished, it had a maximum capacity of 14,500.

On 20 August 1994 the stadium was officially opened by Prince Willem-Alexander of the Dutch royal family. He made the symbolic first kick-off in this stadium. After the opening the first match started between SC Heerenveen and PSV Eindhoven. At the time Ronaldo played at PSV, this match was his first one in Europe.

Expansions

Because SC Heerenveen kept growing and the results were getting better every year, the club planned the first expansion of the stadium in 2002. The capacity of the stadium was almost doubled to 26,100 seats.

Throughout the years empty spots in the stadium were filled with seats. Together with some other changes in the stadium the number of seats increased to the current 26,800.

In 2011 there was a plan to have another expansion of the stadium, taking the capacity to 32,000. The construction should be ready for the start of the 2012/2013 Eredivisie season. The reason for the expansion is the ever growing waiting list for the club's season tickets.

Along with that, more people in the stadium means more income which leads to a bigger budget for the club to work with. However, this expansion was seen as too risky and financially unfeasible.

There were plans to expand the stadium to 29,000 seats over the course of the summer of 2012, however the economic downturn shelved these plans.

World Cup bid

As part of the combined Netherlands and Belgium bid  to host the 2018 or 2022 FIFA World Cup, the stadium was one of five stadiums in the Netherlands selected by the KNVB to host games. A successful bid would have meant that the stadium capacity would have been increased to the minimum required seating of 44,000 . In the beginning of December 2010 FIFA announced that the 2018 World Cup would be awarded to Russia. Just before the announcement of the World Cup the club announced that the next expansion would be postponed.

The other four selected host cities in the Netherlands were Amsterdam (Amsterdam Arena and Olympisch Stadion), Rotterdam (Feijenoord Stadion De Kuip and De Nieuwe Kuip), Eindhoven (Philips Stadion) and Enschede (De Grolsch Veste).

References

Football venues in the Netherlands
Sports venues completed in 1994
Sports venues in Heerenveen
SC Heerenveen
1994 establishments in the Netherlands
20th-century architecture in the Netherlands